The 1947 Mississippi State Maroons football team was an American football team that represented Mississippi State College in the Southeastern Conference (SEC) during the 1947 college football season. In its eighth season under head coach Allyn McKeen, the team compiled a 7–3 record (2–2 against SEC opponents), finished fourth in the SEC, and outscored opponents by a total of 169 to 89.

Three Mississippi State players received honors from the Associated Press (AP) or United Press (UP) on the 1947 All-SEC football team: tackle Dub Garrett (AP-1, UP); quarterback Harper Davis (AP-3); and halfback Shorty McWilliams (AP-1).

Schedule

References

Mississippi State
Mississippi State Bulldogs football seasons
Mississippi State Maroons football